"MIA/NYC NonStop" is the twenty-third episode in the second season of the American crime drama CSI: Miami and also served as backdoor pilot for the spin-off CSI: NY. The episode aired on May 17, 2004 on CBS.

Plot
After sixteen-year-old Laura Spellman finds the brutally slain bodies of her parents, Horatio Caine vows to personally track down the killer and let Laura know she is safe. A scrap of paper with the lettering from a car rental company leads the CSIs to an important clue: the killer flew in from New York. Determined to keep his promise to Laura, Horatio boards a plane to New York, on the tail of Nick Murdoch, whom he believes is the killer.

Meanwhile, in New York, NYPD CSI Mac Taylor is called to the scene of a murder of an undercover officer identified as Nick Murdoch who has been strangled. Horatio arrives in New York and the two CSIs realize that the murderer had stolen Murdoch's identity. Mac agrees to hand over jurisdiction to MDPD. Their investigations lead them to one of New York City's richest families, the Hanovers. Michael Hanover, Sr. was murdered while his son survived the attack. The two teams must now find the link between the murders of two unrelated families and bring the perpetrator to justice before he strikes again.

References

External links

"MIA/NYC NonStop" on TV.com

2004 American television episodes
CSI: Miami
CSI: NY
Television crossover episodes
Television episodes set in Miami
Television episodes set in New York City
Television pilots within series